The Yellow River in north central Wisconsin is a tributary of the Chippewa River.  For the most part it is a mud and rock-bottomed river flowing through forest and farmland.  It is one of four distinct rivers in the state bearing the name Yellow River.

Geography
This Yellow River begins at Matt Ochs Lake and Perch Lake in the township of Molitor near Perkinstown in the Chequamegon National Forest. This area of small lakes and swamps is the terminal moraine left by the last glacier, which reached this far about 18,000 years ago.   The river runs a short way before it forms Chequamegon Waters Flowage, locally known as Miller Dam.  Below Miller Dam, there is one more dam, at Cadott, forming another small reservoir, before the river joins the Chippewa River when it flows into Lake Wissota at Moon Bay.

Much of the Yellow is undeveloped - in particular the upper stretches through the Chequamegon Forest. In very few places will you see any sign of man. The only settlements along the river are Gilman and Cadott.

History
Michel Cadotte started a trading post on the lower Yellow River at the current site of Cadott around 1787.

Logging had begun on the upper Yellow by 1861, when a log-driving dam existed at Hughey. Many such log-driving dams were built to help flush logs out. By 1880 a "winter road" followed the river all the way up the river to Westboro. This would be a "tote road" used by logging operations to supply their crews working upstream.

Bruno Vinette, an early lumberman, tells of running a rapids on the Yellow:
I remember once when the water was very high, Gilbert and Company, on the Yellow River, needed just one crib to complete a raft and offered me twenty-five dollars to bring it down. I rigged up a couple of oars and started down alone. A lot of people stood on the bank watching to see what would happen. Instead of giving me any trouble, the crib floated like a cork. I did not have to touch the oars, and in a few minutes was safe below the falls.

Recreation
In flood stage the Yellow's currents are too strong for even the most skilled of swimmers.

Fishing in this river is some of the best in the area.  The best spot is Chequamegon Waters, for bluegills, crappies, large mouth bass, northern pike, perch and the occasional walleye and smallmouth bass . The most common catch in the river is the northern pike and suckers.  Wildlife abounds around the river including deer, bear, wolves, bobcat, coyote, ruffed grouse, beaver, otter, muskrat, mink, raccoon, turkey and waterfowl.

References 

Rivers of Wisconsin
Rivers of Taylor County, Wisconsin
Rivers of Chippewa County, Wisconsin